Bennebroek is a village and former municipality in the northwest Netherlands, now part of Bloemendaal, North Holland. Before its merger, it was the smallest municipality in the Netherlands, covering an area of only 1.75 km².

History
Bennebroek was probably formed in the 13th century and its development was closely linked to the peat harvesting industry.

On 28 May 1653, Bennebroek split off from the Heemstede fiefdom and Adriaen Pauw, son of Adriaan Pauw, became its first feudal lord. Its population was dependent on animal husbandry and transportation. Later on bulb flower cultivation became an important business here. Yet since the second half of the 20th century, Bennebroek functions primarily as a commuter community for the surrounding cities.

On 29 March 2007, the municipal councils of Bennebroek and Bloemendaal agreed to merge into one municipality, which became reality on 1 January 2009.

Local government 
The last municipal council of Bennebroek before its merger consisted of 11 seats, which were divided as follows:
 VVD - 4 seats 
 CDA - 4 seats
 PvdA - 3 seats

Attractions
Linnaeushof - a recreation park known as Europe's largest children's playground, formerly a botanical garden where Carl Linnaeus acted as hortulanus (lead gardener) in the 18th century and where he wrote the Hortus Cliffortianus
Hartekamp - an estate (partially in Heemstede) with an extensive public park.
Former railway station Vogelenzang-Bennebroek - railway station from 1842.

Gallery

See also
 George Clifford III

References 
 Statistics are taken from the SDU Staatscourant

Municipalities of the Netherlands disestablished in 2009
Former municipalities of North Holland
Populated places in North Holland
Bloemendaal